Lashgar Kuh (also Romanized as Lashgar Kūh; also known as Lākūh and Lā Kūheh) is a village in Hombarat Rural District, in the Central District of Ardestan County, Isfahan Province, Iran. At the 2006 census, its population was 8, in 5 families.

References 

Populated places in Ardestan County